NA-233 Karachi Korangi-I is a constituency for the National Assembly of Pakistan that covers Shah Faisal Colony, and Model Colony.

Members of Parliament

2018-2022: NA-239 Karachi Korangi-I

Election 2002 

General elections were held on 10 Oct 2002. Iqbal Muhammad Ali Khan of Muttahida Qaumi Movement won by 39,196 votes.

Election 2008 

General elections were held on 18 Feb 2008. Iqbal Muhammad Ali Khan of Muttahida Qaumi Movement won by 123,491 votes.

Election 2013 

General elections were held on 11 May 2013. Iqbal Muhammad Ali Khan of Muttahida Qaumi Movement won by 151,788 votes and became the member of National Assembly.

Election 2018 

General elections were held on 25 July 2018.

By-election 2022 
A by-election was held on 16 October 2022 due to the resignation of Muhammad Akram, the previous MNA from this seat. Imran Khan won by a margin of 24,625 votes.

By-election 2023 
A by-election will be held on 30 April 2023 due to the vacation of this seat by Imran Khan, who won it in the 2022 by-election.

See also
NA-232 Karachi Malir-III
NA-234 Karachi Korangi-II

References

External links 
Election result's official website

NA-256
Karachi